Lupinus argenteus is a species of lupine known by the common name silvery lupine. It is native to much of western North America from the southwestern Canadian provinces to the southwestern and midwestern United States, where it grows in several types of habitat, including sagebrush, grassland, and forests. It is sometimes silvery-hairy in texture and sometimes nearly hairless. Each palmate leaf is made up of 5 to 9 leaflets each up to 6 centimetres long. They are narrow and linear in shape, under a centimetre wide. The inflorescence bears many flowers, sometimes arranged in whorls. The banner, or upper petal, of the flower may have a patch of white or yellow. The fruit is a hairy legume pod up to 3 centimeters long containing several beanlike seeds. The plant is an important food source for butterflies. It also attracts birds and hummingbirds.

References

External links
 Jepson Manual Treatment
 Photo gallery

argenteus
Flora of North America